Events from the year 1690 in Sweden

Incumbents
 Monarch – Charles XI

Events

Births

 - Malcolm Sinclair (Swedish nobleman), officer, nobleman and envoy  (died 1739) 
 9 April - Johan Henrik Scheffel, artist  (died 1781)
 - Katarina Asplund, pietist  (died 1758)

Deaths

 - Gustaf Düben, organist and composer (born 1628)
 - Johannes Gezelius the elder, bishop (born 1615)

References

External links

 
Years of the 17th century in Sweden
Sweden